The Sanford Consortium for Regenerative Medicine (SCRM) or the Sanford Consortium is a non-profit biomedical research institute located in La Jolla, California. It was formed from a collaboration between the Sanford Burnham Prebys Medical Discovery Institute, the Salk Institute for Biological Studies, Scripps Research, the University of California, San Diego, and the La Jolla Institute for Immunology

The SCRM 'consortium' research building is 136,700 square-feet. It is located on a 7.5-acre property nearby to and leased from UCSD.

The development and construction of the SCRM building and facilities from 2007 through 2011 cost $106,572,300 in construction and $21,028,500 in equipment acquisition costs.

References

Medical research institutes in California
Cancer organizations based in the United States
Stem cell research
La Jolla, San Diego
Medical and health organizations based in California
Independent research institutes